Carroll Township is a township in Washington County, Pennsylvania, United States. The population was 5,381 at the 2020 census.

Geography

Demographics
At the 2000 census there were 5,677 people, 2,265 households, and 1,701 families living in the township.  The population density was 420.4 people per square mile (162.4/km2).  There were 2,344 housing units at an average density of 173.6/sq mi (67.0/km2).  The racial makeup of the township was 98.26% White, 1.09% African American, 0.05% Native American, 0.11% Asian, 0.05% Pacific Islander, 0.21% from other races, and 0.23% from two or more races. Hispanic or Latino of any race were 0.74%.

Of the 2,265 households 26.0% had children under the age of 18 living with them, 63.4% were married couples living together, 7.8% had a female householder with no husband present, and 24.9% were non-families. 22.3% of households were one person and 13.2% were one person aged 65 or older.  The average household size was 2.45 and the average family size was 2.85.

The age distribution was 19.6% under the age of 18, 4.9% from 18 to 24, 24.1% from 25 to 44, 26.8% from 45 to 64, and 24.7% 65 or older.  The median age was 46 years. For every 100 females, there were 93.0 males.  For every 100 females age 18 and over, there were 90.7 males.

The median household income was $43,347 and the median family income  was $52,526. Males had a median income of $40,970 versus $24,698 for females. The per capita income for the township was $20,380.  About 4.8% of families and 6.4% of the population were below the poverty line, including 6.8% of those under age 18 and 8.9% of those age 65 or over.

See also

 Hazel Kirk, Pennsylvania

References

Townships in Washington County, Pennsylvania
Pittsburgh metropolitan area
Townships in Pennsylvania